The Silliman University College of Business Administration is one of the constituent colleges of Silliman University, a private research university found in Dumaguete, Philippines. The College was established in 1938 in the same year Silliman acquired university status. When the College opened, it offered courses in accounting, secretarial practices and economics. In the years that followed additional programs were added into its course offerings and various modifications were made in its organizational structure.

By 1989, the College was already recognized as one of the top business schools in the country when the Department of Education, Culture and Sports together with the Professional Regulation Commission and the Board of Accountancy jointly awarded the college the Top Achievement Award for having achieved the third highest weighted averaging passing in the CPA Licensure Examinations for the years 1977 to 1988.

In 1999, it was one among 14 schools nationwide designated by the Commission on Higher Education as a Center of Development in Business and Management Education. At present, it is on Level III accreditation status, a Center of Development in Accountancy Education, and ranks 2nd in the nation based on CPA licensure examination results.

Academic Offerings

Graduate
Master in Business Administration

Undergraduate
BBA Majors in General Business, Management, and Economics
BS in Accountancy
BS in Business Computer Applications
BS in Entrepreneurship
BS in Office Management

Pictures

Alumni
 Juanita Amatong, Monetary Board Member and former Philippine Secretary of Finance
 Leonor Briones, Philippine Ambassador to the W8 and former National Treasurer of the Philippines
 Prakit Pradipasen, Thai Banker: Senior Executive Vice-President of the Siam Commercial Bank
 Ricardo Balbido, Jr., President and CEO of the Philippine Veterans Bank

References

External links
College of Business Administration official website

Business Administration
Business schools in the Philippines